Pete Sampras defeated Ivan Lendl, 7–6(7–5), 6–4 to win the 1994 Medibank International tennis singles event. Sampras defended his title from 1993.

Seeds

Draws

Finals

Section 1

Section 2

External links
 ATP Singles draw

men